"New Way (To Light Up an Old Flame)" is a song co-written and recorded by American country music artist Joe Diffie.  It was released in June 1991 as the fourth and final single from his debut album A Thousand Winding Roads.  The song peaked at number 2 on the Hot Country Singles & Tracks (now Hot Country Songs) chart.  The song was written by Diffie and Lonnie Wilson.

Chart positions

Year-end charts

References

1991 singles
1990 songs
Joe Diffie songs
Songs written by Joe Diffie
Song recordings produced by Bob Montgomery (songwriter)
Epic Records singles
Songs written by Lonnie Wilson